During World War II,  (abbreviated as RKU) was the civilian occupation regime of much of Nazi German-occupied Ukraine (which included adjacent areas of modern-day Belarus and pre-war Second Polish Republic). It was governed by the Reich Ministry for the Occupied Eastern Territories headed by Alfred Rosenberg. The administration's tasks included the pacification of the region and the exploitation, for German benefit, of its resources and people. Adolf Hitler issued a  Decree defining the administration of the newly occupied Eastern territories on 17 July 1941.

Before the German invasion, Ukraine was a constituent republic of the Soviet Union, inhabited by Ukrainians, Russians, Jewish, Belarusian, Romanian, Polish and Roma/Gypsy minorities. It was a key subject of Nazi planning for the post-war expansion of the German state. The Nazi extermination policy in Ukraine, with the help of local Ukrainian collaborators, ended the lives of millions of civilians in The Holocaust and other Nazi mass killings: it is estimated 900,000 to 1.6 million Jews and 3 to 4 million non-Jewish Ukrainians were killed during the occupation; other sources estimate that 5.2 million Ukrainian civilians (of all ethnic groups) perished due to crimes against humanity, war-related disease, and famine amounting to more than 12% of Ukraine's population at the time.

History

Nazi Germany launched Operation Barbarossa against the Soviet Union on 22 June 1941 in breach of the mutual Treaty of Non-Aggression. The German invasion resulted in the collapse of the western elements of the Soviet Red Army in the former territories of Poland annexed by the Soviet Union.

On 20 August, Hitler established the Reichskommissariat Ukraine and appointed Erich Koch as Reichskommissar. On the same day, Hitler announced that the region would be under civil administration from noon on 1 September and delineated the boundaries of the region.

Originally subject to Alfred Rosenberg's Reich Ministry for the Occupied Eastern Territories, it became a separate German civil entity. The first transfer of Soviet Ukrainian territory from military to civil administration took place on 1 September 1941. There were further transfers on 20 October and  1 November 1941, and a final transfer on 1 September 1942, which brought the boundaries of the province to beyond the Dnieper river.

In the mind of Adolf Hitler and other German expansionists, the destruction of the USSR, dubbed a "Judeo-Bolshevist" state, would remove a threat from Germany's eastern borders and allow for the colonization of the vast territories of Eastern Europe under the banner of "" (living space) for the fulfilment of the material needs of the Germanic people. Ideological declarations about the German  (master race) having a right to expand their territory especially in the East were widely spread among the German public and Nazi officials of various ranks. Later on, in 1943, Erich Koch said about his mission: "We are a master race, which must remember that the lowliest German worker is racially and biologically a thousand times more valuable than the population here."

On 14 December 1941, Rosenberg discussed with Hitler various administrative issues regarding the Reichskommissariat Ukraine. These included a dispute over Koch's status and access to Hitler, manpower shortages over gathering the harvest, Hitler's insistence that the Crimea and much of Southern Ukraine was to be "cleaned out" (i.e., unwanted nationalities to be removed), and directly attached to the Reich as a district called  ("Land of the Goths") the renaming of cities such as Simferopol to "Gotenburg" and Sevastopol to "Theoderichshafen" (after the ancient Gothic king Theodoric the Great) and an adjustment to the border with Romanian-controlled Transnistria to remove overlooking of the shipyards at Mykolaiv.

Hitler decreed the creation of the Nazi Party organization  for the new eastern occupied territories on 1 April  1942. This move had been bitterly resisted by both Rosenberg, who rightly feared that the transformation of the administration of the eastern territories from a state to a party bureaucracy would spell the effective end of the authority of his ministry (which was a state organ), and Heinrich Himmler, who rightly feared that an arbeitsbereich's establishment would be accompanied by the commissars becoming RVKs (commissars for war) and thus enormously empowered at the expense of the SS, which had already been steadily losing ground since late September the previous year, when the commissariat government began establishing itself with local commissars asserting control over the police in their territories, hitherto controlled by the SS. Himmler and Rosenberg's rearguard resistance soon collapsed in the face of pressure from Martin Bormann in Berlin, and Koch and Lohse in the field. Rosenberg at least managed to be appointed Reichsleiter ("Reich leader") of the new arbeitsbereich. Rosenberg later attempted to take such political power into the political section of the ministry to keep all party issues in his control, and prohibited the creation of organizations and any political activity in the East without his express authorization. Needless to say, he was entirely disobeyed.

Hoping that by joining forces they might regain some influence, Himmler and Rosenberg decided upon the appointment of Gottlob Berger, Himmler's political hatchet man and the SS's head of personnel, as Rosenberg's deputy, a move which in theory would give Rosenberg control over SS forces in the occupied Soviet territories under civil administration in return for his support for the SS in its power struggles. The partnership between Rosenberg and Himmler achieved nothing other than the exasperation of each other beyond endurance and Berger soon withdrew all cooperation. Koch and Lohse thereafter gradually reduced communication with Rosenberg, liaising with Hitler through Bormann and the party chancellery. Both also made a point of establishing strong SA organisations in their jurisdiction as a counterbalance to the SS. Given that many of the commissariat officials were active or reserve SA officers, the pre-existing grudge against the SS was resurrected by these measures and a poisoning of relations was guaranteed.

On 28 July 1944, the Soviet army occupied the last part of the Reichskommissariat Ukraine, known as Brest. RKU was liquidated on 10 November 1944.

Geography
The Reichskommissariat Ukraine excluded several parts of present-day Ukraine, and included some territories outside of its modern borders. It extended in the west from the Volhynia region around Lutsk, to a line from Vinnytsia to Mykolaiv along the Southern Bug river in the south, to the areas surrounding Kyiv, Poltava and Zaporizhzhia in the east. Conquered territories further to the east, including the rest of Ukraine (the Crimea, Chernihiv, Kharkiv, and the Donbas/Donets Basin), were under military governance until 1943–44. At its greatest extent, it included just under 340,000 square kilometers.

Eastern Galicia was transferred to the control of the General Government following a Hitler decree, becoming its fifth district, (District of Galicia). Former Soviet territory between the Southern Bug and Dniester rivers was also excluded from the Reichskommissariat Ukraine; this was given to Romania and named "Transnistria" or "Transniestra", governed from Odesa by Dr. Alexeanu, the Romanian Governor.

It also encompassed several southern parts of today's Belarus, including Polesia, a large area to the north of the Pripyat river with forests and marshes, as well as the city of Brest-Litovsk, and the towns of Pinsk and Mazyr. This was done by the Germans in order to secure a steady wood supply and efficient railroad and water transportation.

Administration

The  'Secretary of State' Herbert Backe was personally nominated by the Reich Minister for the Occupied Eastern Territories, Alfred Rosenberg. His ministry produced the "Instruktion für einen Reichskommissar in der Ukraine" for the direction of future administrators of the Reichskommissariat Ukraine.

"..." ( translat.: The Reich's Commissioners are subordinated under the Reich's minister for the occupied eastern territories and receive only orders from him) was the "Führer" decree for the administration of the new eastern territories, the Reichskommissars reported to the Eastern Affairs Ministry.

The capital of this German administration was in Rivne in Western Ukraine.

The German Administration gave the role of "Chief of Ukrainian Principal Commission" to Wolodomyr Kubijowytsch, an early local supporter.

The civil and criminal justice local administration, apart from the local SS and Wehrmacht military justice branches, was staffed by "Parteien Chef", "Bailiffs", "Mayors", with supervision of German "Schoffen" (Advisers) and "Schlichten" (Arbiters) with ample legal powers. The most important cases or situations which affected "natural rights" of any "Aryan" subject, were managed in Rivne or Berlin.

The Wehrmacht introduced reforms in Ukraine allowing limited religious liberty. In January 1942, Bishop Polikarp Sikorsky of the Ukrainian Autocephalous Orthodox Church became the temporary administrator of church lands in the German-occupied Ukraine and he was granted the title of Archbishop of Lutsk and Kovel. He also had authority over Bishoprics at Kyiv, Zhytomyr (Bishop Hryhorij Ohijchuk), Poltava, Kropyvnytskyi, Lubny (Bishop Sylvester Hayevsky), Dnipro and Bila Tserkva (Bishop Manuyil Tarnavsky) by decree of the Civil German Administration of limited religious liberty in Ukraine. The German Administration also allowed Archbishop Alexander of Pinsk and Polesia to maintain the religious authority he wielded before the war and the same permission was granted to Archbishop Alexander of Volhynia.

Political figures related with the German administration of Ukraine

 Alfred Rosenberg, Reich Minister for the Occupied Eastern Territories
 Georg Leibbrandt, Eastern Ministry
 Otto Bräutigam, Eastern Ministry
 Reichskommissar Ukraine, Erich Koch
 Alfred Eduard Frauenfeld, Generalkommissar for Generalbezirk Krim-Taurien
 Kurt Klemm, Generalkommissar for Generalbezirk Shitomir (October 1941 – October 1942)
 Ernst Ludwig Leyser, Generalkommissar for Generalbezirk Shitomir (October 1942 – October 1943)
 Helmut Quitzrau, Generalkommissar for Generalbezirk Kiev (September 1941 – February 1942)
 Waldemar Magunia, Generalkommissar for Generalbezirk Kiev (February 1942 – 1944)
 Ewald Oppermann, Generalkommissar for Generalbezirk Nikolajev
 Heinrich Schoene, Generalkommissar for Generalbezirk Wolhynien-Podolien
 Claus Selzner, Generalkommissar for Generalbezirk Dnepropetrowsk (September 1941 – June 1944)
 Karl Stumpp, ethnographer and leader of the SS Sonderkommando Dr Karl Stumpp

Military commanders linked with the German administration of Ukraine
 Wehrmachtsbefehlshaber Ukraine (WBU)
 Generalleutnant d.R. Waldemar Henrici (until October 1942)
 General der Flieger Karl Kitzinger (from October 1942)
Höherer SS- und Polizeiführer Southern Russia (HSSPF Russland-Süd)
 SS-Obergruppenführer Friedrich Jeckeln (June–October 1941)
 SS-Obergruppenführer Hans-Adolf Prützmann (October 1941 – 1944; from October 1943 also Höchster SS- und Polizeiführer (HöSSPF) Ukraine)
Höherer SS- und Polizeiführer Black Sea (HSSPF Schwarzes Meer)
 SS-Gruppenführer Ludolf-Hermann von Alvensleben (October–December 1943)
 SS-Obergruppenführer Richard Hildebrandt (December 1943 – August 1944)
 SS-Gruppenführer Adolf von Bomhard, head of police
 SS-Gruppenführer Walter Schimana, commander of the SS Division Galicia
 SS-Brigadeführer Fritz Freitag, commander of the SS Division Galicia

Administrative divisions

The Reichskommissariat's administrative capital was at Rivne, and it was divided into six Generalbezirke (general districts), called Generalkommissariate (general commissariats) in the pre-Barbarossa planning. This administrative structure was in turn subdivided into 114 Kreisgebiete, and further into 443 Parteien.

Each "Generalbezirk" was administered by a "Generalkommissar"; each Kreisgebiete "circular [i.e., district] area" was led by a "Gebietskommissar" and each Partei "party" was governed by a Ukrainian or German "Parteien Chef" (Party Chief). At the level below were German or Ukrainian "Akademiker" ("Academics"—i.e., District Chiefs) (similar to Polish "Wojts" in the General Government). At the same time at a smaller scale, the local Municipalities were administered by native "Bailiffs" and "Mayors", accompanied by respective German political advisers if needed. In the most important areas, or where a German Army detachment remained, the local administration was always led by a German; in less significant areas local personnel was in charge.

The six general districts were (English names and administrative centres in parentheses):

 Shitomir (Zhytomyr) – headed by Regierungpräsident Kurt Klemm, then by SS-Brigadeführer Ernst Ludwig Leyser (from 1942)
 Kiew (Kyiv) – headed by SA-Brigadeführer Helmut Quitzrau (till February 14, 1942), then SA-Oberführer Waldemar Magunia (from February 14, 1942)
 Nikolajew (Mykolaiv) – headed by NSFK-Obergruppenführer Ewald Oppermann
 Wolhynien und Podolien (Volhynia and Podolia; Luzk) – headed by SA Obergruppenführer Heinrich Schoene
 Dnjepropetrowsk (Dnipro) – headed by Oberbefehlshaber der NSDAP ('party commander in chief') Claus Selzner
 Krym-Taurien (Crimea-Taurida; Melitopol) – headed by Gauleiter Alfred Frauenfeld

Scheduled for incorporation into the Reichskommissariat Ukraine but never transferred to civil administration were the Generalkommissariate Tschernigow (Chernihiv), Charkow (Kharkiv), Stalino (Donetsk), Woronezh (Voronezh), Rostow (Rostov-on-Don), Stalingrad, and Saratow (Saratov), which would have brought the boundary of the province to the western border of Kazakhstan. In addition, Reichskommissar Koch had wishes of further extending his Reichskommissariat to Ciscaucasia.

Krym-Taurien

The administrative position of the Krim Generalbezirk remained ambiguous. According to the original German plan it was to correspond approximately to the old Taurida Governorate (therefore including also mainland portions of Ukraine), and was to consist of two Teilbezirke (sub-districts):
 Taurien (the mainland sections, including parts of the Mykolaiv and Zaporizhzhia provinces.)
 Krym (the Crimean peninsula)

Only the first of these saw transfer to civil administration in September 1942, with the peninsula remaining under military control for the duration of the war. Its administrator, Frauenfeld, played off the military and civil authorities against each other and gained the freedom to run the territory as he saw fit. He thereby enjoyed complete autonomy, verging on independence, from Koch's authority. Frauenfeld's administration was much more moderate than Koch's and consequentially more economically successful. Koch was greatly angered by Fraunfeld's insubordination (a comparable situation also existed in the administrative relationship between the Estonian general commissariat and Reichskommissariat Ostland).

The district's title was a misnomer, it only included the area north of the Crimean peninsula up to the Dnieper river.

Demographics
The official German press, in 1941, reported the Ukrainian urban and rural populations as 19 million each. During the commissariat's existence the Germans only undertook one official census, for January 1, 1943, documenting a population of 16,910,008 people. The 1926 Soviet official census recorded the urban population as 5,373,553 and the rural population as 23,669,381 – a total of 29,042,934. In 1939, a new census reported the Ukrainian urban population as 11,195,620 and rural population as 19,764,601 – a total of 30,960,221. The Ukrainian Soviets counted 17% of total Soviet population.

Security

The Wehrmacht came under pressure for political reasons to gradually restore private property in zones under military control and to accept local volunteer recruits into their units and into the Waffen-SS, as promoted by local Ukrainian nationalist organizations, the OUN-B and the OUN-M, whilst receiving political support from the Wehrmacht.

The German Reichsführer-SS and chief of German Police, Heinrich Himmler, initially had direct authority over any SS formations in Ukraine to order "Security Operations", but soon lost it – especially after the summer of 1942 when he tried to regain control over policing in Ukraine by gaining authority for the collection of the harvest, and failed miserably, in large part because Koch withheld cooperation. In Ukraine, Himmler soon became the voice of relative moderation, hoping that an improvement in the Ukrainians' living conditions would encourage greater numbers of them to join the Waffen-SS's foreign divisions. Koch, appropriately nicknamed the "hangman of Ukraine", was contemptuous of Himmler's efforts. In this matter Koch had the support of Hitler, who remained skeptical when not hostile to the idea of recruiting Slavs in general and Soviet nationals in particular into the Wehrmacht.

Economic exploitation

In the civil administration of the Reich Ministry for the Occupied Eastern Territories numerous technical staff worked under Georg Leibbrandt, former chief of the east section of the foreign political office in the Nazi Party, now chief of the political section in the Ministry for the Occupied Eastern Territories. Leibbrandt's deputy, Otto Bräutigam, had previously worked as a consul with experience in the Soviet Union. Economic affairs remained under the direct management of Hermann Göring (the Plenipotentiary of Germany's Four Year Plan). From 21 March 1942 Fritz Sauckel had the role of "General Plenipotentiary for Labour Deployment" (Generalbevollmächtigter für den Arbeitseinsatz), charged with recruiting manpower for Germany throughout Europe, though in Ukraine Koch insisted that Sauckel confine himself to setting requirements, leaving the actual "recruitment" of Ost-Arbeiter to Koch and his brutes. The Todt Organization Ost Branch operated from Kyiv. Other members of the German administration in Ukraine included Generalkommissar Leyser and Gebietkommissar Steudel.

The Ministry of Transport had direct control of "Ostbahns" and "Generalverkehrsdirektion Osten" (the railway administration in the Eastern territories). These German central government interventions in the affairs of the East Affairs by ministries were known as Sonderverwaltungen (special administrations).

The position of the Eastern Affairs Ministry was weak because its department chiefs: (Economy, Work, Foods & Crops and Forest & Woods) held similar posts in other government departments (The Four-Year Plan, Eastern Economic Office, Foods and Farming Ministry, etc.) with other supplementary junior staff. Thus the East Ministry was managed by personal criteria and particular interests over official orders. Additionally, they failed to maintain the "Political Section" at an equal level with more specialized departments (Economy, Works, Farms, etc.) because political considerations clashed with exploitation plans in the territory.

The Reich Ministry for the Occupied Eastern Territories ordered Koch and Hinrich Lohse (the Reichskommissar of Ostland) in March 1942 to supply 380,000 farm workers and 247,000 industrial workers for German work needs. Later Koch was mentioned during the new year message of 1943, how he "recruited" 710,000 workers in Ukraine. This and subsequent "worker registration" drives in Ukraine would eventually backfire after the Battle of Kursk (July–August 1943) when the Germans would attempt to build a defensive line along the Dnieper only to discover that the necessary manpower had been either recruited to forced labour in Germany or had gone underground to forestall such "recruitment".

Alfred Rosenberg implemented an "Agrarian New Order" in Ukraine, ordering the confiscation of Soviet state properties to establish German state properties. Additionally the replacement of Russian Kolkhozes and Sovkhozes, by their own "Gemeindwirtschaften" (German Communal Farms), the installation of state enterprise "Landbewirstschaftungsgessellschaft Ukraine M.b.H." for managing the new German state farms and cooperatives, and the foundation of numerous "Kombines" (Great German exploitation Monopolies) with government or private capital in the territory, to exploit the resources and Donbas area.

Hitler said "Ukraine and the East lands would produce 7 million, or more likely 10 or 12 million tonnes of grain to provide Germany's food needs".

German intentions

According to the Nazis, both Jewish and Slavic Ukrainians were untermensch and therefore only fit for enslavement or extermination. Erich Koch, who was chosen by Adolf Hitler to rule Ukraine, made the point about the inferiority of Ukrainians with a certain simplicity: "Even if I find a Ukrainian who is worthy of sitting at my table, I must have him shot" and "remember that the lowliest German worker is racially and biologically a thousand times more valuable than the population here, which is more distinct from Aryan genealogy than Leningrad."

The regime was planning to encourage the settlement of German and other "Germanic" farmers in the region after the war, along with the empowerment of some ethnic Germans in the territory. Ukraine was the furthest eastern settlement of the migrating ancient Goths between the 2nd and 4th centuries and subsequently, according to Hitler, "Only German should be spoken here". The sending of Dutch settlers was charged to the "Nederlandsche Oost-Compagnie", a Dutch-German Company dedicated to encourage the colonization of the east by Dutch citizens.

The German civil administration met "Volksdeutsche" (ethnic Germans) in Mykolaiv, Zaporizhzhia and Dnipro. The archives of the Soviet census in 1926 counted them as 393,924 persons. The Soviets counted ethnic Germans in all Russia at 1,423,534, or 1% of the total population in 1939.

The administration took measures to protect Germans in the area who were entered on their Volksdeutsch racial list. They received special rights
 the return of their land and property prior to the Soviet Revolution
 permission to return to visit parents in the motherland
 the creation of special German resident zones in Dnipro and other areas
 encouraged recruitment to the Wehrmacht or service in the civil administration in the territory, amongst other special measures.

In Ukraine the Germans published a local journal in the German language, the Deutsche Ukrainezeitung.

During the occupation a very small number of cities and their accompanying districts maintained German names. These cities were designated as urban strongholds for Volksdeutsche natives. Hegewald (Himmler's field headquarters and the location of a small, experimental German colony), Försterstadt (also a Volksdeutsche colony), Halbstadt (a Low German Mennonite settlement), Alexanderstadt, Kronau and Friesendorf were some of these.

On 12 August 1941 Hitler ordered the complete destruction of the Ukrainian capital of Kyiv by the use of incendiary bombs and gunfire. Because the German military lacked sufficient material for this operation it wasn't carried out, after which the Nazi planners instead decided to starve the city's inhabitants. Heinrich Himmler on the other hand considered Kyiv to be "an ancient German city" because of the Magdeburg city rights that it had acquired centuries prior, and often referred to it as "Kiroffo".

See also 
 Babi Yar
 The Death Match
 Hunger Plan
 Massacres of Poles in Volhynia and Eastern Galicia
 Ostarbeiter
 Ukrainian collaborationism with the Axis powers
 Word of the Righteous

References

Further reading

 .
 .
 .

External links
 
 Map of Occupied Europe 

 

Ukraine
German occupation of Poland during World War II
Belarus in World War II
Military history of Germany during World War II
Military history of the Soviet Union during World War II

1941 establishments in Ukraine
1944 disestablishments in Ukraine
States and territories established in 1941
States and territories disestablished in 1944
Babi Yar
German military occupations